Head over Heels is a British television comedy-drama programme lasting one series, which was broadcast on ITV from 11 January to 22 February 1993. It starred Ann Bell as Gracie Ellis, Sally Geoghegan as Catherine Ellis, Kathy Kiera Clarke as Bernadette Brennan and Elena Ferrari as Patsy Willoughby. The programme was produced at the Pinewood Studios.

Premise
Comedy drama set in the 1950s, an exploit of a group of girls at a finishing school.

Cast
Gracie Ellis – Ann Bell
Catherine Ellis – Sally Geoghegan
Bernadette Brennan – Kathy Kiera Clarke
Patsy Willoughby – Elena Ferrari
Heather Brook – Diana Morrison
Camilla De La Mer – Jackie Morrison
Jimmy Ellis – Ian Embleton
Alice Willoughby – Jessica Lloyd
Stella Dunn – Gemma Page
Jack Ellis – Michael Thomas
Daniel – Nick Haverson

Episodes
All seven episodes were written by Jane Prowse.

References

External links

1990s British comedy-drama television series
1993 British television series debuts
1993 British television series endings
ITV television dramas
British comedy-drama television shows
Carlton Television
1990s British television miniseries
Television series by ITV Studios
English-language television shows
Television series produced at Pinewood Studios
Television series set in the 1950s
Television shows set in London